Syed Irfan Abbas Rizvi (born 5 June 1975) is a poet, writer and auhakhawn (Noha reciter) from Nasirabad, Uttar Pradesh, India. He is well known in the Shia community and is considered the best Noha auhakhawn who recites his own nauhe. He rose to fame in the 1996s when his Nohas and poetry gained popularity overseas.

Biography

Early life
Syed Irfan Abbas Rizvi born in Nasirabad to Syed Qinayat Abbas Rizvi a famous sozkhawn and nouhakhwan. At the age of six his family settle in Raebareli from there he did schooling. He won many championship in inter school tournament he was very brilliant student. After schooling, he completed his graduation from University of Lucknow in 1993 and had passed his MA in Urdu literature from University of Lucknow.

Career
Syed Irfan Abbas Rizvi lives in Mumbai, Maharashtra, India and works as a fashion designer and from there he writes Urdu poetry, Nauhe, etc. He released his first Cassette of Nauha in 1996.

Personal life
He is a Twelver Shia married with the daughter of Adeeb-E-Asr Allama Syed Ali Akhtar Rizvi, a Twelver Shī'ah scholar, speaker, author, historian and poet. They have two daughters and one son.

Famous couplets
Some of his notable couplets are:

See also
List of Urdu-language poets
List of Indian poets
Syed Ali Akhtar Rizvi
Nasirabad
Noha

References

External links
Biography of Irfan Nasirabadi
Irfan Nasirabadi Blog
Youtube.com| Irfan nasirabadi Nauhe
irfan nasirabadi nauhe
Facebook Fanpage

1975 births
Twelvers
Indian Shia Muslims
Living people
University of Lucknow alumni
Indian male poets
Poets from Maharashtra